Phillip Anthony Dumatrait (born July 12, 1981) is an American former professional baseball pitcher. He played in Major League Baseball (MLB) for the Cincinnati Reds, Pittsburgh Pirates, and Minnesota Twins. He also played for the LG Twins of the KBO League.

Early life
Born in Bakersfield, California, Dumatrait played for Bakersfield College before he was drafted by the Boston Red Sox in the 2000 Major League Baseball Draft.

Baseball career

Cincinnati Reds
On July 30, 2003, the Red Sox traded Dumatrait, left-hander Tyler Pelland and cash considerations to the Cincinnati Reds for right-handed relief pitcher Scott Williamson.  Dumatrait spent a majority of his minor league career in the Reds organization with AA Chattanooga Lookouts and AAA Louisville Bats.

In 2004, Dumatrait suffered a season-ending elbow injury and underwent Tommy John surgery.

In 2007, Dumatrait made his major league debut with the Cincinnati Reds.

Pittsburgh Pirates
The Pittsburgh Pirates claimed him off waivers on October 26, 2007. He started the 2008 season as a reliever, but became a starter when Matt Morris was released.  He gained his first major league victory on May 7, 2008, against the San Francisco Giants, pitching  shutout innings in the 3–1 Pirates victory.  Dumatrait missed the last several months of the season because of an arm injury and opted to have surgery performed.

On September 19, 2009, the Pittsburgh Pirates announced their intention to send Dumatrait to their AAA affiliate, the Indianapolis Indians.

He was non tendered a contract after the 2009 season and became a free agent.

On December 19, 2009, Dumatrait signed a minor league contract with the Detroit Tigers with an invite to spring training.

LG Twins
On May 19, 2010, Dumatrait signed with LG Twins of the KBO League.

Minnesota Twins
On November 17, 2010, Dumatrait signed a minor league deal with an invitation to spring training with the Minnesota Twins. He had his contract purchased by the Twins on May 15, 2011. He declared for free agency on October 21.

Dumatrait retired on May 29, 2012.

References

External links

Career statistics and player information from the KBO League
 Cincinnati Releases Former Lookouts Pitching Prospect But Pittsburgh Grabs Phil Dumatrait

1981 births
Living people
Baseball players from Bakersfield, California
Major League Baseball pitchers
Cincinnati Reds players
Minnesota Twins players
Pittsburgh Pirates players
LG Twins players
Bakersfield Renegades baseball players
KBO League pitchers
American expatriate baseball players in South Korea
Gulf Coast Red Sox players
Lowell Spinners players
Augusta GreenJackets players
Sarasota Red Sox players
Potomac Cannons players
Chattanooga Lookouts players
Louisville Bats players
Gulf Coast Pirates players
State College Spikes players
Altoona Curve players
Indianapolis Indians players
Toledo Mud Hens players
Rochester Red Wings players